Brotherly Love is a 1999 sitcom starring Gregor Fisher and James Fleet.  The show was made in Scotland and similar to Last of the Summer Wine.

Recently, it has been aired in the United States on various PBS stations as part of 'One Season Wonders.'

Plot
Frank Robertson returns to Invercorrie for his Uncle Archie's funeral and meets up with his brother Hector whom he has never seen eye to eye with very much because they both fancied the beautiful Kate Cameron when they were young.

Cast
Gregor Fisher as Hector Robertson
James Fleet as Frank Robertson
Caroline Langrishe as Kate Robertson

External links

BBC press release 

BBC television sitcoms
Scottish television sitcoms
1999 Scottish television series debuts
2000 Scottish television series endings
1990s Scottish television series
2000s Scottish television series